Alakshmi (Devanāgari: अलक्ष्मी; from the roots अ (a): "not" and लक्ष्मी (Lakshmi): "goddess of fortune", figurative meaning "goddess of misfortune") meaning "not Lakshmi". She is described as being "cow-repelling, antelope-footed, and bull-toothed." Or she "has dry shriveled up body, sunken cheeks, thick lips, and beady eyes and that she rides a donkey." 

She is not mentioned by name in the Vedic, Upanishadic or early Puranic literature, but all aspects of Alakshmi match those of the Rig Vedic goddess Nirṛti. She is also said to be the shadow of Lakshmi. In Padma Purana, the cosmology includes her where the Samudra Manthana creates both good and bad of everything that emerges. That which is inauspicious and bad emerges first, more effort creates the auspicious and good, according to Padma Purana. First Alakshmi emerges, then Lakshmi appears during the Samudra Manthana. Gods send Alakshmi to go dwell amongst pernicious persons, give them poverty and grief. She as the asura of inauspiciousness and grief is the opposite of Lakshmi who is the goddess of auspiciousness and joy. Alakshmi is sometimes referred to be another name of Jyestha. Alakshmi is also known as Kalahapriya and Daridara, and the shadow opposite of Lakshmi.

According to Chakrabarty, “It was said that when she entered a household, Alakshmi brought jealousy and malice in her trail. Brothers fell out with each other, families and their male lineages (kula) faced ruin and destruction."

References

External links

Alaksmi
Fortune goddesses
Consorts of Kali (demon)